This Time of Year is a 1961 album by American jazz vocalist June Christy, arranged and conducted by Pete Rugolo.

Christy's only Christmas album, it consists entirely of original songs, unusual for its time. Composed by the husband-and-wife songwriting team of Connie Pearce and Arnold Miller.

Critical reception
AllMusic called the album "unjustly neglected," writing that it "is that rarest of things -- a winter concept album of all new material that can be listened to even when the holidays are over."

Track listing
"Christmas Heart" – 2:57
"Ring a Merry Bell" – 3:05
"Hang Them on the Tree" – 2:21
"The Little Star" – 3:08
"The Merriest" – 2:09
"This Time of Year" – 3:34
"Seven Shades of Snow" – 3:32
"Sorry to See You Go" – 2:24
"The Magic Gift" – 3:26
"Winter's Got Spring Up Its Sleeve" – 2:36

All compositions by Connie Pearce and Arnold Miller.

Personnel
 June Christy – vocals
 Frank Beach – trumpet
 Don Fagerquist – trumpet
 Dick Nash – trombone
 Kenny Shroyer – bass trombone
 Jim Decker – French horn
 Vincent DeRosa – French horn
 Richard Perissi – French horn
 Red Callender – tuba
 Sam Rice – tuba
 Bob Cooper – tenor saxophone, bass clarinet, oboe
 Bud Shank – alto saxophone, flute
 Paul Horn – flute
 Ted Nash – flute
 Victor Arno – violin
 Israel Baker – violin
 Robert Barene – violin
 Anatol Kaminsky – violin
 Dan Lube – violin
 Alfred Lustgarten – violin
 Lou Raderman – violin
 Albert Steinberg – violin
 Gerald Vinci – violin
 Virginia Majewski – viola
 Ray Mehennick – viola
 Stanley Harris – viola
 Edgar Lustgarten – cello
 Eleanor Slatkin – cello
 Catherine Gotthoffer – harp
 Russ Freeman – piano
 Al Viola – guitar
 Joe Mondragon – bass
 Red Mitchell – bass 
 Gene Estes – drums, vibes, celeste, bell
 Shelly Manne – drums

Tracks 1, 4, 6 
Recorded Capitol Tower, Hollywood, 12 January 1961

Tracks 7, 9, 10
Recorded Capitol Tower, Hollywood, 19 January 1961

Tracks 2, 3, 5, 8
Recorded Capitol Tower, Hollywood, 23 January 1961

References

June Christy albums
1961 Christmas albums
Capitol Records Christmas albums
Albums arranged by Pete Rugolo
Albums conducted by Pete Rugolo
Christmas albums by American artists
Jazz Christmas albums
Albums recorded at Capitol Studios